The 1901 Clemson Tigers football team was an American football team that represented Clemson Agricultural College—now known as Clemson University–as a member of the Southern Intercollegiate Athletic Association (SIAA) during the 1901 SIAA football season. In its second season under head coach John Heisman, the team posted a 3–1–1 record (2–0–1 against SIAA opponents) and finished in second place in the SIAA.

Schedule

References

Clemson
Clemson Tigers football seasons
Clemson Tigers football